Carlsberg station is an S-train station in Copenhagen, Denmark, that serves the Carlsberg area of the Vesterbro/Kongens Enghave district. Situated on the Høje Taastrup radial of the S-train network, it opened on 3 July 2016 and replaced Enghave station, which was located 200m east.

History
The station was designed by Gottlieb Paludan Architects and constructed for the Carlsberg Byen development company between 2014 and 2016, before being handed over to Banedanmark and DSB for operation. It serves the new residential and retail developments on the former Carlsberg brewery site, as well as the adjacent University College Capital campus; it is expected to become one of the five busiest S-train stations in Copenhagen, with approximately 24,000 travellers per day. It is located on the site of the brewery's freight depot, Station Høje, which was in operation from 1937 until 1985.

See also
 List of railway stations in Denmark

References

External links

S-train (Copenhagen) stations
Railway stations opened in 2016
Vesterbro, Copenhagen
Railway stations in Denmark opened in the 21st century